Otago is a region of New Zealand in the South Island.

Otago may also refer to:

New Zealand
 Otago (New Zealand electorate), from 1978 to 2008
 HMNZS Otago, two ships of the Royal New Zealand Navy
 Otago, a barque skippered by Joseph Conrad
 Otago Harbour, Dunedin
 Otago Peninsula, the peninsula around Otago Harbour
 Otago Province, a province from 1853 to 1876 
 University of Otago, Dunedin
 Otago Rugby Football Union, the governing body of rugby union for Otago

Elsewhere
 Otago, Tasmania, a suburb of Hobart
 Otago Bay, Tasmania, a bay in Tasmania
 Ōtagō Station, a train station in Chikusei, Ibaraki Prefecture, Japan
 Otago Patent, tract of land in New York claimed by the Franklin family